Even Born Again is a six-song EP by Denton singer-songwriter Sarah Jaffe. The EP was produced and recorded by John Congleton at Elmwood Studios in Dallas, Texas. Even Born Again features Dallas musicians Jonathan Clark, Becki Phares Howard, Ben Moore, Jeff Ryan, and Kris Youmans. The album was released on August 20, 2008 by Summer Break Records.

Track listing 
 Even Born Again
 Black Hoax Lie
 Adeline
 Under
 Two Intangibles Can't Be Had
 Backwards/ Forwards

References

2008 EPs
Sarah Jaffe albums